The 2010 European Table Tennis Championships was held in Ostrava, Czech Republic from 11–19 October 2010. Venue for the competition was ČEZ Aréna.

Medal summary

Men's events

Women's events

References

2010
European Championships
International sports competitions hosted by the Czech Republic
Table Tennis European Championships
Table tennis in the Czech Republic
October 2010 sports events in Europe
Sport in Ostrava